International Animal Rescue (IAR) is an animal protection and conservation non-profit organisation that comes to the aid of suffering animals with hands-on rescue and rehabilitation and the protection of wildlife habitats. IAR returns rehabilitated animals to the wild while also providing permanent sanctuary for those that cannot fend for themselves. Its work includes cutting free and caring for captive bears in India and Armenia, rescuing and rehabilitating orangutans and other primates in Indonesia and treating injured and orphaned howler monkeys in Costa Rica. IAR strives to educate the public in the humane treatment of all animals and the preservation of the natural environment. International Animal Rescue has offices in the United Kingdom, United States, India, Indonesia and Malta.

History

International Animal Rescue was established by John and Jo Hicks and first registered as a charity in the United Kingdom in September 1989; in Goa, India in 1998; in the United States in 2001 and in the Netherlands and Indonesia in 2008. IAR Malta became an officially recognised body in 1993.

The first clinic and rescue centre was established in Goa in 1989 to sterilise stray dogs and cats. The Goa centre (known as Animal Tracks) was licensed under the Animal Birth Control (ABC) grant system introduced by Maneka Gandhi.

Patrons

International Animal Rescue's patrons are: Peter Egan, Bill Bailey, Jo Brand, Elkie Brooks, Maneka Gandhi, Dr Scott Miller, Dr Roger A Mugford, Trevor Woodman MBE.

Dancing bear rescue and rehabilitation
The practice of dancing bears was made illegal in India in 1972 but in the decades that followed sloth bears were still poached from the wild and forced to perform for tourists.

In 2002, International Animal Rescue, together with Indian partner organisation Wildlife SOS, opened the first sanctuary for rescued dancing bears near Agra and the Taj Mahal.

In December 2009, International Animal Rescue and Wildlife SOS succeeded in bringing this cruel practice to an end by rescuing Raju, the last dancing bear in India.

The rescued bears live in a semi-natural environment in sanctuaries in Agra bear rescue facility,Agra and Bannerghatta National Park, near Bangalore.

The rehabilitation of the bears' handlers formed an integral part of the project, ensuring they would not revert to bear dancing as a way of earning a living. The Kalandar tribespeople who danced the bears were taught new trades such as rickshaw driving or carpet weaving to help them support their families.

Primate rescue and rehabilitation
IAR Indonesia grew out of a group called ProAnimalia International that cared for animals confiscated from the illegal trade circuit.

In 2006 ProAnimalia became part of International Animal Rescue and in 2007 a new primate rescue and rehabilitation centre was built in Ciapus, near Bogor, on the island of Java.

IAR Indonesia specialises in rescuing and rehabilitating orangutans, macaques and slow lorises and releasing them back into protected areas in the wild.

In Indonesian Borneo, IAR rescues and cares for critically endangered orangutans at its conservation centre in Ketapang, West Kalimantan, from orphaned infants to fully grown adults that have spent years in captivity. The rescue centre on the island of Java has facilities for the treatment and care of macaques and slow lorises.

Dog welfare 
In 1998 International Animal Rescue set up a rescue centre called Animal Tracks in the town of Mapusa in the north of Goa, India, to address the welfare issues of the stray dog population. The sterilisation and vaccination programmes dramatically reduced the numbers of strays and, as a result of the anti-rabies vaccinations, cases of rabies in humans were also eliminated in the areas where IAR operates.

International Animal Rescue's veterinary centre in Trichy, Tamil Nadu was established in 2005 by Dr Deike Schacht. The centre's aim was to control and care for the stray dog population with sterilisation and vaccination, and to provide shelter and treatment for sick and injured dogs.

Cat welfare 
International Animal Rescue's veterinary teams in India and Indonesia routinely sterilise stray cats as a means of reducing and controlling their populations. 

Through Catastrophes Cat Rescue, International Animal Rescue gives sanctuary to unwanted cats in the United Kingdom. The cats receive veterinary treatment and are spayed or neutered.

Bird protection 
International Animal Rescue joined the campaign to end the illegal shooting of migrating birds in Malta in 1990 and lobbied at a national and European level for greater bird protection while working closely with the police and the Ministry of Environment and Rural Affairs to help animals in need. IAR also provided a 24-hour emergency helpline where inquiries were taken about abandoned animals, illegal bird hunting and trapping, wildlife trafficking and instances of animal cruelty.

For many years International Animal Rescue was involved in the campaign to end illegal hunting in Malta by supporting the work of the wildlife protection unit of the police known as the ALE (Administrative Law Enforcement.) Every spring and autumn IAR would assist the Committee Against Bird Slaughter (CABS) at their bird protection camps. Volunteer bird guards recruited from all over the world and trained by CABS are based in Malta to monitor migration and record any illegal shooting or trapping. A control room is set up and staffed day and night and the police are alerted immediately to any illegal activity so that their patrols can respond swiftly and track down the culprits. Conservationists come from all over Europe and some from further afield to take part in the camps and do their bit to stop the senseless slaughter of thousands of birds every year.

References

External links
International Animal Rescue global website
International Animal Rescue Goa, India website
YouTube channel

Animal charities based in the United Kingdom
1989 establishments in the United Kingdom
Animal welfare organisations based in the United Kingdom
Organizations established in 1989